Carron railway station  is the railway station which serves the tea gardens of Carron, Looksan, Grassmore etc. near Diana river of Jalpaiguri district in the Indian state of West Bengal. It lies in the New Jalpaiguri–Alipurduar–Samuktala Road line of Northeast Frontier Railway zone, Alipurduar railway division. Local trains along with some important trains like Siliguri–Alipurduar Intercity Express etc. are available from this station.

References

Railway stations in West Bengal
Alipurduar railway division
Railway stations in Jalpaiguri district